Change the World is an EP by English singer-songwriter Ringo Starr, released on 24 September 2021 by Universal Music Enterprises. It was produced by Starr and Bruce Sugar, except for "Coming Undone", which was produced by the pair along with Linda Perry, who also wrote the track.

Track listing

Personnel
Drums, Percussion, Vocals – Ringo Starr
Guitar – Steve Lukather (1), Joe Walsh (4)
Acoustic Guitar, Bass, Percussion, Backing Vocals - Linda Perry (3)
Acoustic Bass – Nathan East (4)
Piano – Bruce Sugar (2, 4)
Troy Andrews - Trumpet, Trombone, Horns arrangements 
Backing Vocals – Amy Keys, Windy Wagner

Production 
Co-producers – Bruce Sugar (1, 2, 4), Linda Perry (3)
Creative Director – Vartan (4)
Design – Scott Richie
Mastered By – Gavin Lurssen
Photography By – Scott Richie

Charts

References

2021 EPs
Ringo Starr EPs
Albums produced by Linda Perry
Albums produced by Ringo Starr